Bely (masculine), Belaya (feminine), or Beloye (neuter) may refer to:
Bely (surname) (or Belaya), Russian last name
Bely Island, an island in the Kara Sea, a part of Yamalo-Nenets Autonomous Okrug, Russia
Bely Urban Settlement, an administrative division and a municipal formation which the town of Bely in Belsky District of Tver Oblast, Russia is incorporated as
Bely, Russia (Belaya, Beloye), several inhabited localities in Russia
Bely (volcano), a volcano in Russia
Belaya River, several rivers in Russia
Belaya (air base), an air base in Irkutsk Oblast, Russia
Lake Beloye (Vologda Oblast), a lake in Vologda Oblast

See also
Beli (disambiguation)
Bely Gorod
Bely Yar